Luis Eduardo Espinosa Pérez (born 27 June 1956) is a Mexican politician affiliated with the Party of the Democratic Revolution. He served as Deputy of the LIX Legislature of the Mexican Congress as a plurinominal representative.

References

1956 births
Living people
Politicians from Mexico City
Members of the Chamber of Deputies (Mexico)
Party of the Democratic Revolution politicians
National Autonomous University of Mexico alumni
21st-century Mexican politicians
Deputies of the LIX Legislature of Mexico